Sahaspur is a town and a nagar panchayat in Bijnor district in the Indian state of Uttar Pradesh.

Geography
It has an average elevation of 199  metres (653  feet).

Demographics
The Sahaspur city is divided into 15 wards for which elections are held every 5 years. According to the 2011 census of India, the population of 24,463 of which 12,822 are males while 11,641 are females.

The population of Children with age of 0-6 is 3719 which is 15.20% of total population of Sahaspur (NP). In Sahaspur Nagar Panchayat, Female Sex Ratio is of 908 against the state average of 912. Moreover, Child Sex Ratio in Sahaspur is around 972 compared to Uttar Pradesh state average of 902. The literacy rate of Sahaspur city is 60.60% lower than the state average of 67.68%. In Sahaspur, Male literacy is around 64.05% while female literacy rate is 56.76%.

Languages

Hindi and Urdu are the official languages. At the time of the 2011 Census of India,60.70% of the population of the sahaspur spoke Hindi, 40.25% Urdu as their first language.

Notable people 
 Lokendra Singh (ex-MLA 24noorpur)
 Tanzil Ahmed (D.S.P, NIA)

References

Cities and towns in Bijnor district